An extreme cold warning is issued by Environment Canada to inform the public about active or imminent severe cold temperatures in their region that are expected to last for at least two hours.

As of April 8, 2014, Environment Canada replaced the Wind Chill Warning with an Extreme Cold Warning. In the older system a wind chill warning for Southern Ontario and Atlantic Canada was issued when the wind chill dropped to -35. Under the new system the extreme cold warning is issued based on either the temperature or the wind chill being a certain value for at least two hours.

Ranges for issuing an extreme cold warning

An extreme cold warning is issued when the following temperatures are expected to last for at least two hours, which different regions have different criteria for:
South-Central Ontario and Southwestern Ontario issued at 
Southeastern Ontario, the Southern Interior of British Columbia, the British Columbia Coast and Atlantic Canada (excluding Labrador) issued at 
Quebec (excluding northern Quebec) issued at 
Northern Ontario (excluding the far north), Central Interior of British Columbia and the Prairies (Alberta, southern Manitoba, southern Saskatchewan) issued at 
Far northern Ontario, northern Manitoba (excluding northeastern Manitoba), northern Saskatchewan, Northern Interior of British Columbia and Labrador issued at 
Northern Quebec (excluding Nunavik) issued at 
Yukon, Northwest Territories (excluding Paulatuk, Sachs Harbour, Ulukhaktok), Baffin Island, and northeastern Manitoba issued at 
Nunavik issued at 
Northwest Territories (Paulatuk, Sachs Harbour, Ulukhaktok only) and Nunavut (excluding Baffin Island) issued at

United States
In the United States an extreme cold warning was an experimental weather warning issued by the National Weather Service  in North Dakota, South Dakota, and Minnesota. It was an experimental advisory for when the air temperature was dangerously cold, but the wind was too little to warrant a Wind Chill Watch or Warning.

The Extreme Cold Warning was used from January 10, 2011 to April 15, 2011. It was discontinued beginning with the 2011-12 winter storm season. Only five Extreme Cold Warnings were issued in that period: one for Burleigh County, three for areas outside of the Bismarck–Mandan metropolitan area, and one for West Glacier, Montana

In a partner webinar on October 30, 2018, the National Weather Service announced that based on survey feedback, the Extreme Cold Warning and the Wind Chill Warning will be consolidated into the Extreme Cold Warning, meaning that this product would once again be issued on a regular basis. This change was hinted to take effect sometime in 2021, accounting for NWS software upgrades.

Example

URGENT - WEATHER MESSAGE
National Weather Service Missoula MT
237 PM MST Sun Mar 3 2019

MTZ002-003-007-043-041800-
/O.NEW.KMSO.EC.W.0001.190304T0300Z-190304T1800Z/
West Glacier Region-Flathead/Mission Valleys-
Butte/Blackfoot Region-Potomac/Seeley Lake Region-
237 PM MST Sun Mar 3 2019

...EXTREME COLD WARNING IN EFFECT FROM 8 PM THIS EVENING TO 11 AM
MST MONDAY...

The National Weather Service in Missoula has issued an Extreme
Cold Warning, which is in effect from 8 PM this evening to 11 AM
MST Monday.

* TEMPERATURES...15 to 30 below zero, with local areas down to 40
  below zero.

* TIMING...Late this evening through mid morning Monday.

* IMPACTS...Local power outages and broken pipes are possible due
  to the extreme cold.

PRECAUTIONARY/PREPAREDNESS ACTIONS...

An Extreme Cold Warning means that dangerously low temperatures
are expected for a prolonged period of time. Frostbite and
hypothermia are likely if exposed to these temperatures, so make
sure a hat, facemask, and heavy gloves or mittens are available.

&&

$$

See also

Severe weather terminology (United States)
Excessive heat warning - the polar opposite of an Extreme cold warning

References

 
Weather warnings and advisories
Meteorological Service of Canada
Climate of Canada